Goodwood is a Baseball club playing in the South Australian Baseball League. Known as the Indians, their home ground is Mortlock Park in Colonel Light Gardens.
The Goodwood Baseball Club was founded in 1889 and is the oldest baseball club in existence in South Australia and the oldest continuous baseball club in Australia.

The Indians Mission is: To be recognised as the most successful, family oriented and community spirited club in South Australian baseball.

The Club has won Twenty Division 1 premierships throughout their history, recently winning in the 2000, 2003, 2006 and 2013 seasons.

The Indians clubrooms and playing fields, named the GILL LANGLEY SPORTS CENTRE, are located at Mortlock Park, Colonel Light Gardens – their home since 1973. Over this 40-year period the club has developed strong ties with the local community through their Junior, Little League and Senior Programs.

The Indians have a strong membership base of 500 members. This includes 50 Junior playing members, 300 Little League members and 70 Senior players plus their families and friends.

The Indians are proud to be promoted as the "Family Ball Club" as evidenced by the large junior membership and the support from their families.

The Club has strong State and National representation at both Senior and Junior playing levels with a large number involved with the South Australian Sports Institute (SASI) baseball program and the Major League Baseball Academy over many seasons.

The Indians have the only Australian player ever inducted in the Helms Athletics Association Hall of Fame in Mr. Ron Sharpe. They also have two of the first South Australian professional baseball players to venture to the US, in dual Capps Medallist - John Challinor (Los Angeles Dodgers) and triple Capps Medallist - Darren Fidge (Minnesota Twins). Stefan Welch followed in their footsteps with a professional career in the Boston Redsox organisation.

The Club also has many hardworking people off the field who strive to ensure that the "Indians Tradition" will continue for many years to come.

Goodwood Baseball Club is proud of its history and will continue the "Indians Tradition" by leading this state in baseball.

See also
 South Australian Baseball League 2005–2006
 Neil Page

References

External links
Goodwood Baseball Club

Australian baseball clubs
Sporting clubs in Adelaide
Baseball teams established in 1889
1889 establishments in Australia